Suge Knight Represents: Chronic 2000 (Still Smokin') is a compilation album released on May 4, 1999 by Death Row Records and Priority Records. The album features performances by various artists, including 2Pac, Treach, Scarface, Tha Realest, Swoop G, Lil' C-Style, K-Ci, Soopafly, Jewell, Danny Boy, Outlawz, Daz Dillinger, Kurupt, E-40, Top Dogg, DJ Quik, and Miilkbone among others. The album was received poorly by professional reviewers and critics but sold well, charting high on the Billboard Top R&B/Hip-Hop Albums and Billboard 200 charts.

Title
The title "Chronic 2000" was the original title for former Death Row Records artist Dr. Dre's anticipated second album but Suge Knight took the title and used it for this album which forced Dre to retitle his album to 2001.

Track listing

Charts

Weekly charts

Year-end charts

References

External links

1999 compilation albums
G-funk compilation albums
Albums produced by DJ Quik
Albums produced by L.T. Hutton
Gangsta rap compilation albums
Priority Records compilation albums
Death Row Records compilation albums
West Coast hip hop compilation albums